Peter Max Lawrence (born March 19, 1977, in Topeka, Kansas) is a multidisciplinary contemporary artist, as well as performance artist, curator, filmmaker, and film director. He is known to work in painting, video installation, sculpture, photography and drawing. Lawrence has had art exhibitions in galleries throughout the United States and Europe. He has lived in San Francisco and Kansas City, Missouri.

Early life 
Lawrence was born in Topeka, Kansas in 1977, and was adopted soon thereafter by Barbra and Dennis Lawrence. He was raised in Western Wyandotte County in Kansas where he attended St. Patricks, Bishop Ward and Kansas City Kansas Community College. He has identified as being gay, which has influenced his art.

Lawrence received his B.F.A. in 2009 in new genres from the San Francisco Art Institute (SFAI). He received the CAAC fellowship in 1999 and the Garber Grant in 2001. While he was a student, he worked under artist Ian McDonald at a De Young museum artist residency and they produced a film for the Truly CA series. and On that First Day of Autumn; Carletta Sue Kay's, The Lady and the Creature From the Black Lagoon, For the Birds, and Just Another Beautiful Boy; Pookie and the Poodlez's, go go away from me; and The Centauros featuring AL-V, Calavera in Barcelona, Spain.
 Glitter (2005)
Negative Space/Jane Sommerhauser (2006)
Poor Pandora (Spring 2008)
Something to Trade (2008)
Queer in Kansas (2008), an autobiographical film.
 Warholics
 De Young (2017), an experimental documentary as part of the Truly CA series,

Curator 

 2019 – THE ONE
 2015 – Lid Off Film Festival, alongside the Grassroots Art Center, Lucas Area Community Theater, Lucas, Kansas
 2014 – The News with Kolmel WithLove at SOMArts, San Francisco, California

References

External links

Absolute Arts reviews of Peter Max Lawrence

Learning to Love You More: Hard Drive to Heaven
authentic-sf.com, April 23 2008, San Francisco Guide
Monologging - Ghost Conference
That Name - Miranda July
Oregon Contemporary - Ungodly
Vertical Gallery
Why Peter Paints
SOMArts San Francisco - At War

1977 births
Living people
Artists from Topeka, Kansas
American performance artists
Bisexual male actors
Bisexual artists
Bisexual musicians
Artists from California
LGBT film directors
American LGBT musicians
Pacific Northwest artists
Film directors from California
Actors from Topeka, Kansas
Musicians from Topeka, Kansas
Film directors from Kansas
20th-century American LGBT people
21st-century American LGBT people